The Penn Medical Emergency Response Team (MERT) is the University of Pennsylvania's student-run volunteer emergency medical services organization, providing care to students, faculty, staff and community members.  MERT's primary responsibility is to provide quick-response emergency medical care before Philadelphia Fire Department paramedic units are available to provide patient transport.  The secondary purpose of MERT is to provide education to the Penn community, specifically CPR training, First Aid training, and alcohol education.

History 

MERT was founded in 2006 by four students at the University of Pennsylvania. After witnessing a delayed medical response to an emergency in the quad, Andrew Mener proposed the establishment of an on-campus EMS organization.  MERT acquired a membership of 50 who prepared for operations by undergoing bicycle safety training through the International Police Mountain Biking Association's standards. MERT's first operational period was Penn's Spring Fling weekend in 2006, where MERT responded to 22 medical calls. This demonstration persuaded university administrators to permit a year-long pilot program. The organization was subsequently funded by the University's Vice Provost for University Life, the University's Department of Public Safety, Fox Leadership, and the Undergraduate Assembly.

MERT's operational hours at its initiation were weekends only, from Thursday night through Sunday.  Starting in the Fall of 2006, MERT extended its service to 7 nights per week during each academic semester.

In 2010, MERT relocated from its headquarters in Sansom Place East, a primarily graduate residence building, to the Quad, which mainly houses freshmen. This relocation was due to unmanageable space constraints, and allowed MERT to have additional room while moving closer to the zone with highest call density (occurring at or around the Quad). Despite a failed attempt at obtaining a fly car in 2010, MERT continues to seek administrative approval for new EMS vehicles.

In 2012, MERT was officially recognized as a Quick Response agency by the Pennsylvania Department of Health, making it the first University in the Philadelphia region to be recognized as such.

Operations

Daily Operations
MERT operates from 5 PM to 7 AM on weekdays and continuously on weekends during the academic year.  Each MERT crew consists of 2-4 members certified as Emergency Medical Technicians in the Commonwealth of Pennsylvania. These crews include a crew chief (or lead EMT), and one/two biking EMTs. MERT typically responds using specially equipped EMS bikes carrying all necessary medical equipment to handle both traumatic injuries and medical emergencies.  As a BLS service in Pennsylvania, MERT is able to provide oxygen therapy, stabilize trauma patients, splint suspected fractures and joint injuries, utilize artificial airways, provide ventilatory support, administer certain medications (including Epinephrine) and defibrillate patients.  The typical response time of MERT is less than 5 minutes.

Special Events
MERT provides additional hours and coverage during athletic and major University events such as New Student Orientation, Spring Fling, the Penn Relays, Hey Day, and Graduation. During these events, multiple crews of 3-4 EMTs may be deployed to ensure quick and adequate emergency response. MERT members receive additional training in preparation for special events, which often includes simulated scenarios of common emergencies encountered.

Disaster Response
MERT is also trained to handle mass casualty incidents that could potentially occur within the Penn Community. The organization, in conjunction with the University's Division of Public Safety, operates mass casualty incident drill each semester, where simulated patients must be triaged and treated for injuries. Prior simulations have included a bus accident and a mass shooting. In the case of an actual emergency or disaster, MERT members would be contacted by the University's Division of Public Safety and could possibly be given instructions to respond.

Education
MERT offers a variety of training opportunities for both its members and members of the greater Penn community.  Training includes EMT training, American Heart Association CPR training, and Continued Medical Education credits.  EMT training is contracted through an outside provider each year and generates approximately 18 new EMTs per class.  CPR training is provided by MERT members trained as CPR Instructors at the Healthcare Provider level.  CPR classes are conducted for MERT members, Penn Nursing students, college house residents, and other members of the Penn community (including staff members and Penn parents).  MERT frequently invites guest lecturers from the University of Pennsylvania Health System, including trauma surgeons, cardiologists, paramedics and other health professionals to speak at its weekly general body meeting. When speakers are not available, MERT members practice treating patients with simulated medical emergencies.

MERT Board
MERT's board is responsible for the operation and administration of the organization. As MERT is student-run, all board members are students at the University.

Executive Board

Chief: Max Yang

Captain: Amelie Warneryd

QA Lieutenant: Julia Pfrommer

Training Lieutenant: Randy Bach

Administrative Director: Kira Lu

General Board

Equipment Officer: Shannon Zheng

Social Officer: Cindy Li

Co-Community Outreach Officer: Junny Kim

Co-Community Outreach Officer: Victor Tsao

EMT Class Membership Officer: Bella Barbosa

Reciprocity Membership Officer: Micaela Alpert

Bike Officer: Pavan Iyengar

Scheduling Officer: Camilla Whitesel

Disaster Response Team Officer: Christopher Capiola

Internal Technology Officer: Graham Branscom 

CPR Officer: Akin Adio

Standby Officer: Benita Cui

 Board members must remain in good standing within the organization to maintain their position.

Awards
Since its founding in 2006, MERT has been the recipient of numerous awards, from both the National Collegiate Emergency Medical Services Foundation and University Officials.

External links
Penn MERT's website
MERT - Division of Public Safety

References

Collegiate EMS agencies
University of Pennsylvania
Emergency medical services in the United States
Medical and health organizations based in Pennsylvania
2006 establishments in Pennsylvania